Luna is an unincorporated community in eastern Chicot County, Arkansas, United States. The community sits between the Mississippi River to the northeast and Lake Chicot to the southwest. Lake Chicot State Park lies to the south.

References

Unincorporated communities in Chicot County, Arkansas
Unincorporated communities in Arkansas